Brachyphalangy is a condition in which one or more of the phalanges of the fingers and toes are smaller than normal.

This condition is one of the most common non-syndromic causes of brachydactyly and  clinodactyly.


Causes 

This condition is caused by either fusion or early closure of the phalange's growth plate. One example is brachydactyly type D, which is caused by an early closure of the thumb's distal phalange, leading to a congenitally short thumb with a similarly short and wide thumb nail.

References

Skeletal disorders
Congenital disorders of musculoskeletal system